Flavia Ottaviani (born 17 May 1981) is an Italian former competitive ice dancer. With former partner Massimo Scali, she is the 1997/1998 Junior Grand Prix Final bronze medalist. They placed 4th at the 2000 World Junior Championships. Their partnership ended following the 1999-2000 season.

Competitive highlights
(with Scali)

References

External links
 Competitive highlights
 IceDance.com profile

1981 births
Italian female ice dancers
Living people
20th-century Italian women
21st-century Italian women